In geometry, the cissoid of Diocles (named for Diocles) is a cubic plane curve notable for the property that it can be used to construct two mean proportionals to a given ratio. In particular, it can be used to double a cube. It can be defined as the cissoid of a circle and a line tangent to it with respect to the point on the circle opposite to the point of tangency. In fact, the curve family of cissoids is named for this example and some authors refer to it simply as the cissoid. It has a single cusp at the pole, and is symmetric about the diameter of the circle which is the line of tangency of the cusp. The line is an asymptote. It is a member of the conchoid of de Sluze family of curves and in form it resembles a tractrix.

Construction and equations

Let the radius of  be .

In other words, the polar equation of the cissoid is

Applying some trigonometric identities, this is equivalent to

Let  in the above equation. Then

are parametric equations for the cissoid.

Converting the polar form to Cartesian coordinates produces

Construction by double projection

A compass-and-straightedge construction of various points on the cissoid proceeds as follows. Then the cissoid is the locus of points .

To see this, let  be the origin and  the line  as above.

To find the point of intersection , set  in this equation to get

which are the parametric equations given above.

While this construction produces arbitrarily many points on the cissoid, it cannot trace any continuous segment of the curve.

Newton's construction

The following construction was given by Isaac Newton. Then the midpoint  of  describes the curve.

By translation and rotation, take  and   the line . In other words . Also,  is the -coordinate of  if it is rotated by angle , so . After simplification, this produces parametric equations

Change parameters by replacing  with its complement to get

or, applying double angle formulas,

But this is polar equation 

Note that, as with the double projection construction, this can be adapted to produce a mechanical device that generates the curve.

Delian problem
The Greek geometer Diocles used the cissoid to obtain two mean proportionals to a given ratio. , as discovered by Hippocrates of Chios. As a special case, this can be used to solve the Delian problem: how much must the length of a cube be increased in order to double its volume?

so  is the side of a cube with double the volume of the original cube. Note however that this solution does not fall within the rules of compass and straightedge construction since it relies on the existence of the cissoid.

Let  and  be given. Let the cissoid 

be constructed as above, with  the origin,  the point , and  the line , also as given above. From the given length , mark  on  so that . Draw  and let  be the point where it intersects the cissoid. Then  is the required length.

To see this, rewrite the equation of the curve as 

and let , so  is the perpendicular to  through .
From the equation of the curve,

From this,

So the equation becomes

so 

as required.

Diocles did not really solve the Delian problem.  The reason is that the cissoid of Diocles cannot be constructed perfectly, at least not with compass and straightedge.  To construct the cissoid of Diocles, one would construct a finite number of its individual points, then connect all these points to form a curve.  (An example of this construction is shown on the right.) The problem is that there is no well-defined way to connect the points.  If they are connected by line segments, then the construction will be well-defined, but it will not be an exact cissoid of Diocles, but only an approximation.  Likewise, if the dots are connected with circular arcs, the construction will be well-defined, but incorrect.  Or one could simply draw a curve directly, trying to eyeball the shape of the curve, but the result would only be imprecise guesswork.

Once the finite set of points on the cissoid have been drawn, then line  will probably not intersect one of these points exactly, but will pass between them, intersecting the cissoid of Diocles at some point whose exact location has not been constructed, but has only been approximated. An alternative is to keep adding constructed points to the cissoid which get closer and closer to the intersection with line , but the number of steps may very well be infinite, and the Greeks did not recognize approximations as limits of infinite steps (so they were very puzzled by Zeno's paradoxes).

One could also construct a cissoid of Diocles by means of a mechanical tool specially designed for that purpose, but this violates the rule of only using compass and straightedge.  This rule was established for reasons of logical — axiomatic — consistency.  Allowing construction by new tools would be like adding new axioms, but axioms are supposed to be simple and self-evident, but such tools are not.  So by the rules of classical,  synthetic geometry, Diocles did not solve the Delian problem, which actually can not be solved by such means.

On the other hand, if one accepts that cissoids of Diocles do exist, then there must exist at least one example of such a cissoid.  This cissoid could then be translated, rotated, and expanded or contracted in size (without changing its proportional shape) at will to fit into any position.  Then one would readily admit that such a cissoid can be used to correctly solve the Delian problem.

As a pedal curve

The pedal curve of a parabola with respect to its vertex is a cissoid of Diocles. The geometrical properties of pedal curves in general produce several alternate methods of constructing the cissoid. It is the envelopes of circles whose centers lie on a parabola and which pass through the vertex of the parabola. Also, if two congruent parabolas are set vertex-to-vertex and one is rolled along the other; the vertex of the rolling parabola will trace the cissoid.

Inversion
The cissoid of Diocles can also be defined as the inverse curve of a parabola with the center of inversion at the vertex. To see this, take the parabola to be x = y2, in polar coordinate  or: 

The inverse curve is thus:

which agrees with the polar equation of the cissoid above.

References

 
 
 "Cissoid of Diocles" at Visual Dictionary Of Special Plane Curves
 "Cissoid of Diocles" at MacTutor's Famous Curves Index
 "Cissoid" on 2dcurves.com
 "Cissoïde de Dioclès ou Cissoïde Droite" at Encyclopédie des Formes Mathématiques Remarquables (in French)
  "The Cissoid" An elementary treatise on cubic and quartic curves Alfred Barnard Basset (1901) Cambridge pp. 85ff

Algebraic curves
Articles containing proofs
Roulettes (curve)